ST Beaujolais was a tanker built in March 1954 by Newport News Shipbuilding and Dry Dock for Tide Water Assoc. Oil and christened Flying A New York. The tanker was later owned by Crest Tankers, Inc. She then entered the National Defense Reserve Fleet at Beaumont, Texas on 29 October 1987. MARAD later gained title on 4 March 1988. In June 2006 she was finally sold for scrap to ESCO Marine, Inc.

References 
 

Tankers of the United States
1954 ships